The restless demon, (Indothemis limbata) is a species of dragonfly in the family Libellulidae. It is found in India, Sri Lanka, Myanmar, Singapore and Thailand. Two subspecies can be found.

Subspecies
 Indothemis limbata limbata (Selys, 1891) 
 Indothemis limbata sita Campion, 1923

Description and habitat
It is a small black dragonfly with yellow markings. Its eyes and thorax are black. Abdomen is also black, marked with yellow spots, obscured with bluish pruinescence in full adults. Bases of wings are dark. Apices of the wings are narrowly black; but transparent in I. l. sita. Anal appendages are dark. 

Female has brown eyes and yellow thorax, marked with black. The bases of wings are in amber-yellow. Abdomen is black, marked with yellow spots up to segment 8. Anal appendages are dark.

It breeds in weeded ponds and lakes.

See also
 List of odonates of Sri Lanka
 List of odonates of India
 List of odonata of Kerala

References

 limbata.html World Dragonflies
 Animal diversity web
 Query Results 

Libellulidae
Odonata of Asia
Insects of Southeast Asia
Insects of Thailand
Least concern biota of Asia